Arjumman Mughal is an Indian actress and international fashion model. Born 1 January 1988 in village lamberi in jammu & Kashmir.currently settled in Mumbai. After a successful modelling career, she made her acting debut in 2008 with the Tamil film Pazhaniappa Kalloori. In February 2014 she again debuted in Bollywood with the MovieYa Rab, with Vishesh films.

Career
Mughal made her acting debut in Bollywood with the film Ya Rab, in which she played the role of Amreen.

Filmography

References

External links

 
 

Living people
Actresses from Jammu and Kashmir
Indian film actresses
Actresses in Hindi cinema
21st-century Indian actresses
Female models from Jammu and Kashmir
People from Rajouri district
People from Srinagar
Year of birth missing (living people)